Mikhail Petrovich Devyataev (Moksha/Erzya: Михаил Петрович Девятаев; 8 July 1917 – 24 November 2002) was a Soviet fighter pilot known for his incredible escape from a Nazi concentration camp on the island of Usedom, in the Baltic Sea.

Early life and military career
Born in 1917 at Torbeyevo, Mikhail was the thirteenth child born to the family of a Mordovian peasant. In 1938 he graduated from a School of River Navigation and worked as the captain of a small ship on the Volga. That same year he was conscripted into the Red Army and began education at a Chkalov Flying School, graduating in 1940.

Devyataev was an early entrant of World War II, destroying his first Ju 87 on 24 June 1941, just two days after Germany attacked the Soviet Union. Soon he was awarded the Order of the Red Banner. On 23 September he was seriously wounded (he was hit in his left leg). After a long stay in the hospital he was assigned to Po-2 unit and then to medical aviation. He resumed his duties as a fighter pilot after his meeting with the famous Soviet ace Aleksandr Pokryshkin in May 1944. Commander of an echelon with the 104th Guards Fighter Aviation Regiment, Senior Lieutenant Devyatayev destroyed nine enemy planes.

Capture and imprisonment

On 13 July 1944 Devyataev was downed near Lviv over German-held territory and became a prisoner of war, held in the Łódź concentration camp. He made an attempt to escape on 13 August but was caught and transferred to the Sachsenhausen concentration camp. He soon realised that his situation was perilous because as a Soviet pilot, he could expect extreme brutality; therefore, he allegedly managed to exchange identities with a dead Soviet infantryman named Nikitenko.

Devyataev was later transferred to a camp in Usedom to be a part of a forced labor crew working for the German missile program on the island of Peenemünde. In the preserved camp records he appears correctly as prisoner 11024 Dewjatajew, Michail, however. Under hellish conditions, the prisoners were forced to repair runways and clear unexploded bombs by hand. Security was rigidly enforced with vicious guards and dogs, and there was little chance of escape. Even so, by February 1945, Devyataev concluded that, however remote, the chance of escape was preferable to certain death as a prisoner.

Escape

Devyataev managed to convince three other prisoners (Sokolov, Krivonogov and Nemchenko) that he could fly them to freedom. They decided to run away at dinner time, when most of the guards were in the dining room. Sokolov and Nemchenko were able to create a work gang composed only of Soviet citizens, as they did not know foreign languages with which to communicate freely and coordinate their plans with other inmates.

At noon on 8 February 1945, as the ten Soviet POWs, including Devyataev, were at work on the runway, one of the work gang, Ivan Krivonogov, picked up a crowbar and killed their guard. Another prisoner, Peter Kutergin, quickly stripped off the guard's uniform and slipped it on. The work gang, led by the "guard", managed to unobtrusively take over the camp commandant's He 111 H22 bomber and fly from the island. Devyataev piloted the aircraft.

The Germans tried to intercept the bomber unsuccessfully. The aircraft was damaged by Soviet air defences, but managed to land in Soviet-held territory. The escapees provided important information about the German missile program, especially about the V-1 and V-2.

The NKVD did not believe Devyataev's story, arguing that it was impossible for the prisoners to take over an airplane without cooperation from the Germans. After a short time in hospital in late March 1945 seven of the escapees were sent to serve in a penal military unit; of the escapees, five died in action over the following months, while three officers including Devyataev spent time in prison during a prolonged investigation.

Postwar

Devyataev was discharged from the army in November 1945. However, his classification remained that of a "criminal", and so he was unable to find a job for some time. Eventually, however, Devyataev found work as a manual laborer in Kazan. Soviet authorities cleared Devyataev only in 1957, after the head of the Soviet space program Sergey Korolyov personally presented his case, arguing that the information provided by Devyataev and the other escapees had been critical for the Soviet space program. 
He took a job at the Kazan river port as a duty officer at the river station, then trained as a captain-mechanic. From 1949 onwards he worked as an assistant to the captain of the longboat Ogonyok; from 1952 he was the captain of the longboat Ogonyok, and from 1955 he was transferred to the position of captain of the motor ship. 

On 15 August 1957, Devyataev became a Hero of the Soviet Union and a subject of multiple books and newspaper articles. He continued to live in Kazan. In the late 1950s, Devyatayev was entrusted with testing the "Raketa", one of the world's first passenger hydrofoil ships; for many years he worked as a captain of river ships and became the first captain of the hydrofoil ship "Meteor"

In 1959, he became a member of the Communist Party of the Soviet Union (CPSU). In 1972, he published his memoirs.

Awards
Hero of the Soviet Union (15 August 1957)
Order of Lenin (15 August 1957)
 Two Order of the Red Banner (1 February 1944, ?)
 Order of the Patriotic War 1st class (11 March 1985) 
 Order of the Patriotic War 2nd class (7 May 1944) 
 Patriotic Order of Merit 2nd class 
 Campaign and jubilee medals

Devyataev became an honoured citizen of the Republic of Mordovia, and of the city of Kazan, in the Russian Federation, along with the cities of Wolgast and Zinnowitz in Germany.

Death and legacy
He died at Kazan in 2002, aged 85, and is buried in the Arskoe Cemetery in Kazan near the World War II Memorial. There is a museum dedicated to Devyataev in his native Torbeyevo (opened on 8 May 1975) and monuments in Usedom and Kazan.

See also
 Bob Hoover
 Sergey Vandyshev

References

Bibliography
 
 

1917 births
2002 deaths
People from Torbeyevsky District
Mordvin people
Soviet Air Force officers
Soviet World War II flying aces
Soviet World War II pilots
Nazi concentration camp survivors
World War II prisoners of war held by Germany
Escapees from German detention
Heroes of the Soviet Union
Russian people of World War II
Soviet prisoners of war
Sachsenhausen concentration camp survivors
Recipients of the Order of Lenin
Recipients of the Order of the Red Banner
Recipients of the Medal of Zhukov
Recipients of the Patriotic Order of Merit
Shot-down aviators
Escapees from Nazi concentration camps
Burials at Arskoe Cemetery